Abdul Hamid Khan (born 13 December 1965) is a Singaporean former badminton player. He is a one-time Olympian and a seven-time national champion.

Career
Hamid entered the national squad in 1985. Then, he was just 19 and had won his first national champion men's singles title. He went on to win another six more until 1995. He also represented Singapore to compete in two events at the 1992 Summer Olympics. 

Hamid retired at the age of 30. He turned to coaching and also served as the Singapore Badminton Association (SBA)’s director of coaching for two years starting in 2000. He is currently the Deputy President of SBA.

Personal life 
Hamid married his long-time girlfriend Murni in April 1993. They have two sons, Irsyad and Imran, and a daughter, Nur Insyirah. Nur Insyirah, like her father, is also a national badminton player and she represented Singapore in the 2017 Southeast Asian Games held in Kuala Lumpur.

References

External links
 

1965 births
Living people
Singaporean male badminton players
Olympic badminton players of Singapore
Badminton players at the 1992 Summer Olympics
Place of birth missing (living people)